CSL Behring is a biopharmaceutical company, manufacturing plasma-derived, and recombination therapeutic products. Its line of therapies includes products for the treatment of bleeding disorders such as hemophilia); hereditary angioedema; inherited respiratory disease; and neurological disorders. The company's products are also used in cardiac surgery, organ transplantation, burn treatment, and to prevent hemolytic diseases in newborns.

CSL Behring is a combination of Behringwerke, founded in 1904 in Marburg, Germany by Emil von Behring, and the Commonwealth Serum Laboratories (CSL), established in Australia in 1916 to provide vaccines to the people of Australia, as well as other companies acquired since 2004

About 
CSL Behring's parent company, CSL Limited, is headquartered in Melbourne, Victoria, Australia. As part of a global alignment, the CSL Behring brand was established in 2007. Previously known as ZLB Behring, the company's history dates back to 1904 when Behringwerke was founded in Germany by Emil von Behring, winner of the first Nobel Prize in Medicine as the inventor of serum therapy or serology.

CSL Behring operates CSL Plasma, one of the world's largest plasma collection networks. It has over 12,000 employees and more than 270 plasma collection centers covering China, the US, and Europe.

History 
In 1904, Von Behring founded the Behringwerke in Marburg, Germany, for experimental work on disease prevention and the manufacture of sera and vaccines. In 1913, Behringwerke expanded to produce a gas gangrene antiserum and a cholera vaccine. 

In 1916, the Commonwealth Serum Laboratories (now CSL Ltd.) were established in Australia to provide vaccines to the people of Australia and New Zealand. In 1930, CSL released an antivenom for tiger snake bites. In 1944, CSL began producing penicillin for the military and Australia.

In 1954, Australian CSL officer Val Bazeley assisted Jonas Salk with the production of the experimental polio vaccine used in the first clinical trials in the US. Bazeley returned to Australia to set up production of the Salk vaccine at CSL. 

In 1981, Behringwerke introduced Haemate, human plasma coagulation factor VIII/von Willebrand factor complex for the treatment of patients with hemophilia A.

In 1991, CSL Limited was incorporated in Australia. In 2004, CSL Limited completed the acquisition of Aventis Behring, combining it with ZLB Bioplasma to create ZLB Behring (later CSL Behring).

In 2007, ZLB Behring became CSL Behring. In 2009, ZLB Plasma changed its name to CSL Plasma to align with its parent company and opened plasma testing laboratories in Knoxville, Tennessee. Also in 2009, the National Organization for Rare Disorders (NORD) recognized CSL Behring for developing and marketing a treatment in the U.S. for acute bleeding episodes in patients with congenital fibrinogen deficiency and the Swiss government awarded CSL Behring the Tell Award. 

In 2012, the European Organisation for Rare Diseases recognized CSL Behring for developing and manufacturing therapies to treat rare and serious medical conditions with a 2012 EURORDIS Company Award.

Over the past century, CSL Behring has acquired: Aventis Behring, U.S. plasma collector Nabi, which helped form the world's largest plasma collection network in CSL Plasma; Calimmune, a leader in gene-modification and cell-delivery technology; and Vitaeris, a biopharmaceutical company focused on the development of Clazakizumab as a potential treatment option for organ transplant recipients experiencing rejection.

In 2021 CSL Behring opened its 300th CSL Plasma processing/donation center in the United States.

Products 
Immunology

 Beriglobin P, human hepatitis A immunoglobulin, liquid 16% solution for intramuscular injection
 Berirab P, human rabies immunoglobulin, liquid 16% solution for intramuscular injection
 Carimune NF, Sandoglobulin, Sanglopor human normal immunoglobulin, freeze-dried formulations for intravenous administration
 Cytogam, human cytomegalovirus immunoglobulin. Liquid immunoglobulin containing a standardized amount of antibody to cytomegalovirus.
 Hepatitis B Immunoglobulin P Behring, human hepatitis B immunoglobulin, liquid 16% solution for intramuscular injection
 Hizentra, Human normal immunoglobulin. Liquid 20% immunoglobulin solution, ready-to-use for subcutaneous administration.
 Privigen, human polyvalent immunoglobulin, liquid 10% solution for intravenous injection.
 Rhophylac human anti-D immunoglobulin. Prefilled syringes of highly purified anti-Rhesus factor D IgG for intravenous administration and intramuscular injection.
 Tetagam P, human tetanus immunoglobulin, liquid 16% solution for intramuscular injection
 Varicellon P, human varicella immunoglobulin, liquid 16% solution for intramuscular injection
Coagulation/bleeding disorders

 Beriate, freeze-dried human coagulationfactor VIII concentrate
 Berinin P, freeze-dried human coagulation factor IX concentrate
 Beriplex P/N, KCentra, a non-activated 4-Factor Prothrombin complex concentrate (4F-PCC) for urgent Warfarin reversal
 Factor X P Behring, a freeze-dried human coagulation factor IX and factor X concentrate
 Fibrogammin P and Corifact, freeze-dried human coagulation factor XIII concentrate
 Helixate FS and Helixate NexGen, freeze-dried recombinant coagulation factor VIII
 Humate-P and Haemate P, freeze-dried human coagulation factor VIII: C and von Willebrand factor concentrate
 IDELVION, freeze-dried recombinant coagulation factor IX Albumin fusion protein
 Monoclate P, a freeze-dried monoclonal antibody purified human coagulation factor VIII concentrate
 Mononine, a freeze-dried human coagulation factor IX that has been purified using monoclonal antibodies
 Octostim, a synthetic desmopressin acetate nasal spray
 RiaSTAP human coagulation factor I, freeze-dried factor I concentrate
 Stimate, a synthetic desmopressin acetate nasal spray
Pulmonary

 Zemaira, freeze-dried Human Alpha1-proteinase inhibitor (A1-PI)
Critical care

 AlbuRx, Alburex, Human Albumin Behring, Albuminar, human albumin solution (5%, 20% or 25% human albumin solutions)
 Berinert P, freeze-dried human C1-esterase inhibitor (C1-INH) concentrate
 Beriplex P/N, Kcentra, freeze-dried human prothrombin complex concentrate
 Haemocomplettan P, RiaSTAP, freeze-dried human fibrinogen (factor I) concentrate
 Kybernin P, freeze-dried human antithrombin III concentrate
 Streptase, freeze-dried streptokinase
Wound healing

 Beriplast P Combi-Set, fibrin sealant kit, freeze-dried fibrin sealant for topical application
 Fibrogammin P, freeze-dried human coagulation factor XIII concentrate
 TachoComb, fibrin sealant fleece-type, fleece-type collagen preparations coated with fibrin glue components

Haemophilia
 Hemgenix, an adeno-associated virus vector-based gene therapy for the treatment of adults with Hemophilia B (congenital Factor IX deficiency) who currently use Factor IX prophylaxis therapy, or have current or historical life-threatening hemorrhage, or have repeated, serious spontaneous bleeding episodes.

(Note: Product availability varies from country to country, depending on registration status.)

Offices 
The company's headquarter is in King of Prussia, Pennsylvania. It has 27,000+ employees in 30 countries. Major manufacturing centers are located in Bern, Switzerland;Marburg, Germany; Kankakee, Illinois; and Broadmeadows, Australia.

References

External links 
 
 
 
 Biography of Emil von Behring – NobelPrize.org

Companies based in Montgomery County, Pennsylvania
Biopharmaceutical companies
Companies with year of establishment missing
Pharmaceutical companies of the United States